The Ambassador of Malaysia to Bosnia and Herzegovina is the head of Malaysia's diplomatic mission to Bosnia and Herzegovina. The position has the rank and status of an Ambassador Extraordinary and Plenipotentiary and is based in the Embassy of Malaysia, Sarajevo.

List of heads of mission

Ambassadors to Bosnia and Herzegovina

See also
 Bosnia and Herzegovina–Malaysia relations

References 

 
Bosnia and Herzegovina
Malaysia